Linda Carmella Sibio is an American performance artist and painter. She is also an advocate for mentally disabled artists and individuals.

Biography 
Linda Carmella Sibio was born in West Virginia in 1953. After her father died, she was raised in an orphanage while her mother was living in a state asylum. By her account, she started drawing at age 11 because she couldn’t sleep. She was diagnosed with paranoid schizophrenia and manic-depression while she was attending Ohio State University, where she earned her BFA in painting in 1975.

Exhibitions 

 1994: West Virginia Schizophrenic Blues, Walker Art Center, Minneapolis

References

Further reading 
 Theatrical Look at Life on the Edge LA Times article on Sibio's performance work, December 21, 1990

External links 
 Gallery Beyond The Madness Online Archive of Linda Carmella Sibio's work
 Interview with Linda Carmella Sibio September 2007 interview at Bootleg Theater

1953 births
Living people
20th-century American women artists
21st-century American women artists
Artists from West Virginia
People from Joshua Tree, California